Mr. Potter of Texas is a 1922 American silent comedy film directed by Leopold Wharton and starring Macklyn Arbuckle, Louiszita Valentine and Corene Uzzell. It is based on the 1888 novel of the same title by Archibald Clavering Gunter.

Cast
 Macklyn Arbuckle as Mr. Potter of Texas
 Louiszita Valentine as Ida Potter
 Corene Uzzell as Lady Annerly
 Robert Frazer as Charles Errol 
 Raymond Hodge as Ralph Errol
 Gloria Smythe as Amy Lincoln
 Gerard Witherby as Lt. Dean
 Harry Carr as The Levantine

References

Bibliography
 Munden, Kenneth White. The American Film Institute Catalog of Motion Pictures Produced in the United States, Part 1. University of California Press, 1997.

External links
 

1922 films
1922 comedy films
1920s English-language films
American silent feature films
Silent American comedy films
American black-and-white films
Films directed by Leopold Wharton
Films set in Texas
Films set in England
Films set in Egypt
1920s American films